Someone Knows Something (or SKS for short) is a podcast by Canadian award-winning filmmaker and writer David Ridgen, first released in March 2016. The series is hosted, written and produced by Ridgen and mixed by Cesil Fernandes. The series is also produced by Chris Oke and executive producer Arif Noorani.

Using investigative journalism, Ridgen narrates a nonfiction story about a criminal cold case over multiple episodes. Episodes are released on a weekly basis; most of the Season 1 episodes ranged from 15 to 40 minutes in length, with Season 2 episodes ranging between 32 and 80 minutes in length. Season 4 was released in February 2018. Season 5 began in October 2018.

Someone Knows Something is Ridgen's first podcast experience; it is also CBC Radio's first true-crime podcast.

Episodes of Someone Knows Something are also sometimes broadcast on CBC Radio One as substitute programming, such as on public holidays and during the summer when some of its regular shows are on hiatus.

Series overview 
The first season of SKS focuses on the June 12, 1972, disappearance of Adrien McNaughton, a five-year-old boy who vanished during a family fishing trip in Eastern Ontario. The McNaughton family is from Arnprior, Ontario, where Ridgen grew up (he and his family moved there shortly after Adrien's disappearance).

The second season follows the disappearance of Sheryl Sheppard in Hamilton, Ontario.  Sheppard went missing on January 2, 1998, two days after her boyfriend, Michael Lavoie, offered a proposal of marriage on a live TV broadcast.  With some assistance from Sheppard's mother, Odette Fisher, Ridgen looks into the case as well as the backgrounds of both Sheryl and Michael, who has been the only person the Hamilton Police Service has named as a suspect in Sheryl's disappearance.

Season 3 of SKS, all six episodes of which were released during the week of November 7, 2017, revisits the 1964 deaths of two teenagers in Mississippi, Charles Moore and Henry Dee; Ridgen previously explored the cold case in a 2007 documentary for CBC, Mississippi Cold Case, which resulted in a re-opening of the case and the eventual conviction of James Ford Seale for the abductions of Moore and Dee.  

In early 2018, Season 4 explored another murder Ridgen had documented for CBC, that of Wayne Greavette, who was killed through the use of a flashlight bomb sent to him in the mail. 

Season five premiered in October 2018 focusing on the 1986 rape and murder of Kerrie Ann Brown in Thompson, Manitoba.
 
Season 6 premiered in May 2020, Donald Izzett Jr. disappeared on Mother's Day 1995.

Episodes

Season 1

Season 2 
On October 21, 2016, a message posted on the show's Facebook page announced that Season 2 is "coming soon".  The first episode of the second season aired on November 21, 2016, with episodes released on a weekly basis (excluding a break for Boxing Week) through the season's conclusion on February 12. It was rebroadcast in the summer of 2017, from June 29 to September 3.

References

External links 
 

2016 podcast debuts
Audio podcasts
Investigative journalism
Canadian talk radio programs
CBC Radio One programs
Canadian podcasts
Crime podcasts